The Kritikos Lagonikos (Cretan Hound) (Greek:Kρητικός Λαγωνικός) is a breed of dog from the island of Crete, in Greece. The Cretan Hound is recognized both in Greece and in Germany. The breed is also considered to be the oldest European dog breed dating to perhaps before 3200 BCE and Neolithic times.

Description

Appearance

The Cretan Hound is a slender dog, somewhere between a scenthound and a sighthound in body, particularly light on its feet (that are oval rather than cat-like) and strong in loin, specially adopted for swift reflexes and high speed over dangerous, rocky terrain. The head is wedge-shaped, elongated and dry, with pricked and very mobile ears that fold backwards. The tail is a key breed characteristic, long and curved upwards, forming a loose or tight ring and covered with a brush of longer hair underneath.

The dog is slightly longer than tall, with medium angulations, slender legs and muscle. The loin is slender yet powerful and there is tuck-up, with the points of the hipbones slightly prominent. The breed has a balance between characteristics of speed and stamina, the conformation being a compromise producing great agility.

The breed can range in colour between pure white, cream, sandy, fawn, grey, black or brindle, bi-colored or tri-colored.

The males of the breed can be 21 to 23 inches (54-58cm tolerance 2cm) and the females 20 to 22.8 inches (52-56cm tolerance 2cm). The weight for males can range between 35 and 49 pounds (16 and 22kg), and females ideally weigh 31-44 pounds (14-20kg).

Temperament
The Cretan Hound uses both sight and scent on the hunt and has a particular tendency to taste aerial or ground scent, even able to suck it from pebbles and stones. When they sense prey, the tail moves in circular fashion and the hound becomes rigid, moments before it begins chasing.

History
The ancient origins of this rare primitive breed date to a time before written history. According to the Cretan Hound Dog Club, the breed is linked in its DNA and its characteristics to hunting dogs represented in ancient artworks discovered by archaeologists in prehistoric settlements of Crete. The hound's ancestors are clearly depicted on Minoan seal stones, on ceramic and metallic utensils, ornamental objects, in sculptures and on frescos now housed in the Heraklion Archaeological Museum.

See also
 Dogs portal
 List of dog breeds
 Alopekis
 Greek Harehound
 Greek Shepherd
 Small Greek domestic dog
 List of dog breeds

External links

  The Cretan Hound, Rarest of All
 "The Hound of Crete" in Shakespeare

References

METAMORPHOSES by OVID: Book III:206-231 Actaeon is pursued by his hounds
CYNEGETICUS by Xenophon: Chapter X

Κρητικός Ιχνηλάτης: Ο αρχαιότερος κυνηγετικός σκύλος της Ευρώπης. Κρητικό Πανόραμα, τεύχος 10, σελ. 118–145, 2005.

Hounds
Dog breeds originating in Greece